Gundala is a mandal headquarter in Yadadri Bhuvanagiri district of the Indian state of Telangana.

References

Villages in Yadadri Bhuvanagiri district